Memecylon angustifolium, or blue mist, is a species of plant in the family Melastomataceae. It is native to India and Sri Lanka. Leaves are  simple, opposite, decussate; lamina narrow linear-elliptic to linear-lanceolate; apex acute, base attenuate, with entire margin. Flowers are blue in color and show axillary umbels inflorescence. Fruit is a blackish purple, one-seeded berry.

The plant is known as "Aattukanala" in Malayanam language, and as "kora kaha - කොර කහ" in Sinhala language.

References

angustifolium
Flora of Sri Lanka
Flora of India (region)